Indomitrella conspersa is a species of sea snail, a marine gastropod mollusk in the family Columbellidae, the dove snails.

Description
The shell size varies between 8 mm and 14 mm

Distribution
This species occurs in the Red Sea, in the Indian Ocean off Madagascar, Mauritius and off the Loyalty Islands, Indonesia and the Philippines.

References

 Vine, P. (1986). Red Sea Invertebrates. Immel Publishing, London. 224 pp
 Kilburn R.N. & Marais J.P. (2010) Columbellidae. pp. 60–104, in: Marais A.P. & Seccombe A.D. (eds), Identification guide to the seashells of South Africa. Volume 1. Groenkloof: Centre for Molluscan Studies. 376 pp
 Severns M. (2011) Shells of the Hawaiian Islands - The Sea Shells. Conchbooks, Hackenheim. 564 pp.

External links
 

Columbellidae
Gastropods described in 1851